Hurricane Pauline was the deadliest hurricane of the 1968 Pacific hurricane season. Before making a second landfall on the state of Sonora on October 3, Pauline lost tropical characteristics. The storm continued inland, passing directly over Ciudad Obregón before dissipating south-southeast of Sierra Vista, Arizona.

There is very little information as to the effects of Pauline on Mexico, but during the passage of the hurricane over Magdalena Bay, a boat disappeared with its five occupants. Despite a large-scale search for the boat or any possible remnants, no trace was ever found. The remnants of Pauline triggered showers over the southwest United States and may have been responsible for a damaging tornado which occurred near Glendale, Arizona.

Meteorological history

The disturbance was in a large area of convection west of Guatemala in the Gulf of Tehuantepec that began to spread  to the west-northwest on September 26. Shortly thereafter, the disturbance was upgraded into a tropical depression. After being upgraded, a vortex began to organize at its center and the depression began to intensify. Other than this ship, all other active boats steered away from the center of the developing system. Later that day, it was determined that the depression had reached tropical storm strength.

After being named, Pauline displayed signs of a tight circulation, but satellite pictures were unable to pick up any distinct features due to nearby cirrus outflow. Around this time, a satellite picture showed a genuine eye beginning to form and banding features became apparent. Even though the picture was distorted due to by electronic problems, the tropical storm was subsequently upgraded to hurricane intensity.

Further investigation into the hurricane was limited to ship reports, and a satellite image on October 1 was mostly not helpful due to another electronic problem; however, it showed that the hurricane had shrunk. A United States Air Force reconnaissance plane flew into the hurricane that day and reported that the eyewall was open on the southwest quadrant. After the breakup of the first eyewall, a break in the clouds lead to the possibility that another eye was forming  to the north-northwest of the previous eye.

No information on the hurricane was available for October 2, when it made landfall near Ciudad Constitutión in Baja California Sur. Satellite imagery showed that Pauline had moved over the Gulf of California, the interaction with land having weakened it to a tropical storm. The storm moved north, making a second landfall near Navojoa. The storm continued inland, passing directly over Ciudad Obregón. The storm dissipated south-southeast of Sierra Vista in Arizona.

Impact, records, and naming
Damage totals from Baja California Sur in relation to the hurricane were never received, but light damage was reported in Navojoa. The Pasadena-based newspaper reported that a tourist in Mazatlán at the time had sent a card saying that the hurricane was responsible for cutting off-shore capers. The Navy report of  winds came after another report that the  auxiliary-powered yawl called the Tiare was missing in the same bay. The ship had left Newport Harbor on September 25 with the destination being Puerto Vallarta and was occupied by a family of five people. The last reported sighting of the yawl was off Cedros Island. After the report of the missing yawl was received, the United States Coast Guard engineered a search for the vessel. The ship was reported as lost and the five occupants were listed as dead. Despite not finding any sign of the ship, the Coast Guard was praised for the extensive search.

The remnants of Pauline were responsible for scattered showers in an area ranging from southern California to Utah and New Mexico. The remnants also caused an F2 tornado on the Fujita Scale. The tornado touched down near Glendale and followed an erratic path to the west, injuring three people due to flying glass, one of which was hospitalized due to their injuries, and causing severe damage to two apartment buildings. Automobiles were damaged by falling concrete blocks and various buildings and trailers were also damaged. In total, the tornado was responsible for $50,000 to $500,000 in damages.

See also

List of Pacific hurricanes

References

Pacific hurricanes in Mexico
Hurricanes in Arizona
Hurricanes in New Mexico
Hurricanes in California
1968 Pacific hurricane season
Category 1 Pacific hurricanes
1968 in California
1968 in Mexico
Hurricanes and tropical depressions of the Gulf of California
1968 natural disasters in the United States
Hurricanes in Baja California
Hurricanes in Baja California Sur